Osip Petrovich Kozodavlev ( – ) was a Russian statesman, politician and Minister of the Interior from March 31 of 1810 to July 24 of 1819.

1754 births
1819 deaths
Politicians of the Russian Empire
Members of the State Council (Russian Empire)
Members of the Russian Academy
Burials at Lazarevskoe Cemetery (Saint Petersburg)
Privy Councillor (Russian Empire)